Ethel Larcombe defeated Elizabeth Ryan 6–3, 6–2 in the All Comers' Final, but the reigning champion Dorothea Lambert Chambers defeated Larcombe 7–5, 6–4 in the challenge round to win the ladies' singles tennis title at the 1914 Wimbledon Championships.

Draw

Challenge round

All comers' finals

Top half

Section 1

Section 2

The nationality of D Elliadi is unknown.

Bottom half

Section 3

Section 4

References

External links

Women's Singles
Wimbledon Championship by year – Women's singles
Wimbledon Championships - Singles
Wimbledon Championships - Singles